Carmella Sabaugh (née Visconti) is an American politician. She served as County Clerk/Register of Deeds for Macomb County, Michigan from 1993 to 2017. Sabaugh was the 2006 Democratic candidate for Michigan Secretary of State.

Early life
She was born of Italian-American Catholic parents as Carmella Visconti in Detroit.  She was orphaned at age eight and raised by an aunt and uncle.  She graduated in 1956 from Denby High School, and attended Wayne State University and Western Michigan University.

She lives in Warren and has five grown children.

Sabaugh served on the Warren city council in 1975-79.  She was elected Warren city clerk in 1979 and served 11 years.  In 1992, she was elected Macomb County Clerk, and was re-elected in 1996, 2000, and 2004, 2008 and 2012.

2006 Secretary of State Election

Sabaugh secured the Democratic nomination for Michigan Secretary of State on August 27, 2006, defeating state Rep. Mary Waters at the Michigan Democratic Party convention. Sabaugh was easily defeated by Republican incumbent Terri Lynn Land, losing by a margin of 56 percent to 42 percent.

2016 Macomb County Clerk Election
In March 2016, Sabaugh filed to seek a seventh term as County Clerk. Speculation began to arise that Sabaugh may drop out of the race after Macomb County Commissioner and former state Rep. Fred Miller announced on April 15 that he would challenge Sabaugh for the Democratic nomination for County Clerk. On April 19, the filing deadline to qualify for Michigan's August primary ballot, Sabaugh called speculation that she would drop out of the race "wishful thinking," while Miller officially filed for the Clerk's race just minutes before the 4 p.m. deadline. On April 22, just 15 minutes before Michigan's 4 p.m. deadline to withdraw from the ballot, Sabaugh announced she would not seek re-election and immediately endorsed Miller, citing a desire to spend more time with her family.

On May 2, 2016, Mt. Clemens political activist Greg Murray filed ethics complaints with the Macomb County Ethics Board against Miller and Sabaugh, saying the pair colluded with former Michigan Democratic Party Chairman Mark Brewer, who filed to run for Miller's seat on the Macomb County Board of Commissioners, saying that Miller personally filed Brewer's paperwork just minutes before the April 19th 4 p.m. filing deadline, an accusation that Miller refused to deny directly. County Executive Mark Hackel said the accusations were "extremely questionable” and that the situation "...doesn’t come across well for voters."

The "plan" backfired for Sabaugh, Miller and Brewer on all fronts. First, Brewer was defeated in the August 2016 primary for the Democratic nomination for Miller's old seat om the Macomb County Board of Commissioners by Elizabeth Lucido. Miller was upset by political novice Karen Spranger, by a margin of 635 votes out of the approximately 376,000 cast.
Miller's stunning loss was attributed to the political coattails of Republican Presidential nominee Donald Trump. Trump garnered 54 percent of the vote in Macomb County, which also saw Republicans Candice Miller (no relation to Fred) and Larry Rocca win countywide races as Public Works Commissioner and County Treasurer respectively and Trump became the first Republican to carry Michigan in a presidential election since 1988.

Electoral history

Macomb County Clerk

Michigan Secretary of State

References

External links
 Macomb County Clerk-Register official site
 Detroit News profile
 WOOD-TV poll including Sabaugh question
 Michigan Liberal's Secretary of State section

County officials in Michigan
American people of Italian descent
People from Macomb County, Michigan
Politicians from Detroit
Living people
Wayne State University alumni
Western Michigan University alumni
People from Warren, Michigan
Women city councillors in Michigan
Year of birth missing (living people)
Denby High School alumni
21st-century American women